The Santo Antão South Opening Tournament (Portuguese: Torneio de Abertura de Santo Antão Sul, Capeverdean Crioulo, ALUPEC or ALUPEK: Turnéu di Abertura di Santo Anton Sul) or the Porto Novo Opening Tournament (Portuguese: Torneio de Abertura do Porto Novo, Capeverdean Creole, ALUPEK: Turnéu di Abertura du Purtu Nobu) is an opening tournament. (equivalent to a league cup) played during the season in the southern part of Santo Antão Island consisting of the municipality of Porto Novo, Cape Verde.  The opening tournament is organized by the Santo Antão South Regional Football Association (ARFSSA).

History
The first competition was held in 1999. In the early years, there were four clubs, in 2008, it risen to six and in 2009, it became seven. In 2015, its club total is nine equaling to that of the regional championships.

Some people thought that the  opening tournament tended its competitions in 2015 as the Santo Antão Cup was revived in late 2015 and earlier in 2014, the creation of the Paul and Ribeira Grande local tournaments lead to the elimination of the opening tournament.  Also that year, its opening tournament competitions was thought to be eliminated in the island's South Zone.  It was not held due to scheduling concerns partly with the single island cup competitions. The next edition started in November 2017.

Winners

Performance By Club

See also
Sports in Santo Antão, Cape Verde
Santo Antão South Premier Division
Santo Antão South Cup
Santo Antão South Super Cup

References

Sport in Santo Antão, Cape Verde
Porto Novo Municipality
Football cup competitions in Cape Verde
1999 establishments in Cape Verde
Recurring sporting events established in 1999